Frank DuVal Hargrove, Sr. (January 26, 1927 – October 16, 2021) was an American politician. From 1982 to 2010 he served in the Virginia House of Delegates, representing the 55th district in the northeast suburbs of Richmond, in and around Hanover County.

On January 26, 2009, Hargrove announced that he would not run for reelection.

Death penalty
Hargrove supported expansion of the death penalty early in his career. Beginning in 2001, he began introducing annual bills to abolish or restrict the death penalty, saying that life without parole was a sufficient and cheaper alternative.

Notes

References

Delegate Frank Hargrove; Virginia House of Delegates (Constituent/campaign website)

External links
 

1927 births
2021 deaths
Republican Party members of the Virginia House of Delegates
Virginia Tech alumni
People from Hanover County, Virginia
United States Army Air Forces soldiers
United States Army personnel of World War II
21st-century American politicians